BS6 may refer to :

 BS6, a BS postcode area for Bristol, England
 BS6, a center drill bit size
 Brilliance BS6, a Chinese car
 BS 6 Properties of Rolled Sections for Structural Purposes, a British Standard
 BS-VI Bharat Stage emission standards in India
Bonomi BS.6 Bigiarella, an Italian glider